Strangers in the Night (originally issued with a sticker stating A Double Live Album) is a live album by British hard rock band UFO, first released in 1979 on the Chrysalis label. The original double LP album was recorded at shows in October 1978 at Chicago, Illinois, and Louisville, Kentucky, while UFO was on tour.

Guitarist Michael Schenker left the band during the tour; this led to the band recruiting former bandmate and ex-Lone Star guitarist Paul Chapman. It has been rumoured that Schenker refused to record any overdubs for the album, which would make this an accurate account of his live guitar work. When he has discussed the album, Schenker has spoken of disappointment with the chosen tracks, saying "there were better takes they could've used".

Strangers in the Night peaked at No. 7 on the UK charts and No. 42 on the US charts. Some critics, and the fans marked it as one of the greatest live rock albums of all time. Kerrang! magazine listed the album at No. 47 among the "100 Greatest Heavy Metal Albums of All Time". Slash, guitarist for Guns N' Roses, has stated that it is his favorite live album. Founding UFO members Pete Way (bass) and Andy Parker (drums) both say it is their favorite UFO record.

Two live EPs in 1979 also proved successful for the band. In February, "Doctor Doctor" (taken from the album), coupled with "On with the Action" (recorded on the same 1978 US tour) and the studio cut "Try Me", reached No. 35 in the UK Singles Chart; this was the first time the band had made the UK Top 40. "Shoot Shoot", coupled with "Only You Can Rock Me" and "I'm a Loser", would make No. 48 in the UK in April.

Some of the songs were recorded at a show on UFO's tour with Blue Öyster Cult.

Reissue
In 1999, EMI reissued Strangers in the Night in an expanded edition featuring two bonus songs, "Hot 'n' Ready" and "Cherry". The announcement at the beginning of the expanded CD version indicates the first track was recorded in Chicago, but this was not so according to the booklet of the 2008 remaster (the songs are pointed as recorded in Youngstown, Ohio, 15 October 1978 and Cleveland, Ohio, 16 October 1978 accordingly). The audience noise is from Chicago and the introduction for the CD was from the Chicago show. At 2:40 into the track "Lights Out", Phil Mogg sings "Lights out, lights out Chicago", which is followed by audience roar.  Two tracks, "Mother Mary" and "This Kid's", are actually studio tracks with crowd noise added, as outlined in the 2008 remaster booklet. The track listing was also reordered to more accurately reflect UFO's setlist at the time. The track list of the 2008 version is identical to the 1999 version; no additional tracks or track list modifications are present.

Outtake songs from the 1978 tour have also been released. A live version of "On with the Action" from the "Doctor Doctor" single was reissued on UFO: The Chrysalis Years (1973-79) in 2011. In addition, two further live songs, "Ain't No Baby" recorded in Kenosha, WI, and "Pack It Up (And Go)" recorded in Columbus, OH, appeared on Hot 'n' Live: The Chrysalis Live Anthology 1974-1983 in 2013. The Japanese version of this release includes a further version of "Pack It Up (And Go)", recorded in Youngstown, OH, as a bonus track.

On Record Store Day 2020, Chrysalis was to release Live in Youngstown 1978, one of the six concerts recorded for Strangers in the Night.

Track listing

Original LP
Side one
"Natural Thing" (Michael Schenker, Phil Mogg, Pete Way) – 3:57
"Out in the Street" (Way, Mogg) – 5:07
"Only You Can Rock Me" (Way, Schenker, Mogg) – 4:08
"Doctor Doctor" (Schenker, Mogg) – 4:42

Side two
"Mother Mary" (Schenker, Mogg, Way, Andy Parker) – 3:25
"This Kid's" (Schenker, Mogg) – 5:11
"Love to Love" (Schenker, Mogg) – 7:58

Side three
"Lights Out" (Schenker, Mogg, Parker, Way) – 5:23
"Rock Bottom" (Schenker, Mogg) – 11:08

Side four
"Too Hot to Handle" (Way, Mogg) – 4:26
"I'm a Loser" (Schenker, Mogg) – 4:13
"Let It Roll" (Schenker, Mogg) – 4:48
"Shoot Shoot" (Schenker, Mogg, Way, Parker) – 4:07

1999 Reissue

"Hot 'n' Ready" (Schenker, Mogg) – 3:26
"Cherry" (Way, Mogg) – 3:44
"Let It Roll" (Schenker, Mogg) – 4:48
"Love to Love" (Schenker, Mogg) – 7:58
"Natural Thing" (Schenker, Mogg, Way) – 3:57
"Out in the Street" (Way, Mogg) – 5:07
"Only You Can Rock Me" (Way, Schenker, Mogg) – 4:08
"Mother Mary" (Schenker, Mogg, Way, Parker) – 3:25
"This Kid's" (Schenker, Mogg) – 5:11
"Doctor Doctor" (Schenker, Mogg) – 4:42
"I'm a Loser" (Schenker, Mogg) – 4:13
"Lights Out" (Schenker, Mogg, Parker, Way) – 5:09
"Rock Bottom" (Schenker, Mogg) – 11:22
"Too Hot to Handle" (Way, Mogg) – 4:26
"Shoot Shoot" (Schenker, Mogg, Way, Parker) – 4:07

2020 Deluxe Edition

Disc 1 (Original LP 1)
"Natural Thing" (Schenker, Mogg, Way) - 3:51
"Out in the Street" (Way, Mogg) - 5:16
"Only You Can Rock Me" (Way, Schenker, Mogg) - 4:09
"Doctor Doctor" (Schenker, Mogg) - 4:39
"Mother Mary" (Schenker, Mogg, Way, Parker) - 3:25
"This Kid's" (Schenker, Mogg) - 5:12
"Love to Love" (Schenker, Mogg) - 8:02

Disc 2 (Original LP 2)
"Lights Out" (Schenker, Mogg, Parker, Way) - 5:32
"Rock Bottom" (Schenker, Mogg) - 11:07
"Too Hot to Handle" (Way, Mogg) - 4:28
"I'm a Loser" (Schenker, Mogg) - 4:14
"Let It Roll" (Schenker, Mogg) - 4:49
"Shoot Shoot" (Schenker, Mogg, Way, Parker) - 4:10

Disc 3 (Live at the International Amphitheater, Chicago, Illinois, USA, 13 October 1978)
"Hot 'n' Ready" (Schenker, Mogg) - 3:54
"Pack It Up (And Go)" (Way, Schenker, Mogg) - 3:15
"Cherry" (Way, Mogg) - 3:32
"Let It Roll" (Schenker, Mogg) - 4:29
"Love to Love" (Schenker, Mogg) - 8:01
"Only You Can Rock Me" (Way, Schenker, Mogg) - 4:15
"Ain't No Baby" (Mogg, Paul Raymond) - 4:07
"Out in the Street" (Way, Mogg) - 5:04
"Doctor Doctor" (Schenker, Mogg) - 4:52
"Lights Out" (Schenker, Mogg, Parker, Way) - 5:12
"Rock Bottom" (Schenker, Mogg) - 10:13
"Too Hot to Handle" (Way, Mogg) - 4:24
"Shoot Shoot" (Schenker, Mogg, Way, Parker) - 3:59

Disc 4 (Live at the Kenosha Ice Arena, Wisconsin, USA, 14 October 1978)
"Hot 'n' Ready" (Schenker, Mogg) - 3:35
"Pack It Up (And Go)" (Way, Schenker, Mogg) - 3:15
"Cherry" (Way, Mogg) - 3:47
"Let It Roll" (Schenker, Mogg) - 4:40
"Love to Love" (Schenker, Mogg) - 7:46
"Only You Can Rock Me" (Way, Schenker, Mogg) - 4:03
"Ain't No Baby" (Mogg, Raymond) - 4:13
"Out in the Street" (Way, Mogg) - 5:00
"Doctor Doctor" (Schenker, Mogg) - 4:52
"Lights Out" (Schenker, Mogg, Parker, Way) - 5:03
"Rock Bottom" (Schenker, Mogg) - 10:58
"Too Hot to Handle" (Way, Mogg) - 4:30

Disc 5 (Live at the Tomorrow Club, Youngstown, Ohio, USA, 15 October 1978)
"Intro / Hot 'n' Ready" (Schenker, Mogg) - 3:49
"Pack It Up (And Go)" (Way, Schenker, Mogg) - 3:38
"Cherry" (Way, Mogg) - 3:41
"Let It Roll" (Schenker, Mogg) - 4:41
"Love to Love" (Schenker, Mogg) - 7:55
"Natural Thing" (Schenker, Mogg, Way) - 3:27
"Out in the Street" (Way, Mogg) - 5:08
"Only You Can Rock Me" (Way, Schenker, Mogg) - 4:06
"On with the Action" (Schenker, Mogg) - 4:47
"Doctor Doctor" (Schenker, Mogg) - 4:51
"Lights Out" (Schenker, Mogg, Parker, Way) - 5:08
"Rock Bottom" (Schenker, Mogg) - 10:24
"Too Hot to Handle" (Way, Mogg) - 4:35
"Shoot Shoot" (Schenker, Mogg, Way, Parker) - 3:46

Disc 6 (Live at the Agora Theater, Cleveland, Ohio, USA, 16 October 1978)
"Hot 'n' Ready" (Schenker, Mogg) - 3:57
"Pack It Up (And Go)" (Way, Schenker, Mogg) - 3:22
"Cherry" (Way, Mogg) - 4:00
"Let It Roll" (Schenker, Mogg) - 4:47
"Love to Love" (Schenker, Mogg) - 8:24
"Natural Thing" (Schenker, Mogg, Way) - 3:32
"Out in the Street" (Way, Mogg) - 5:16
"Only You Can Rock Me" (Way, Schenker, Mogg) - 4:16
"On with the Action" (Schenker, Mogg) - 4:56
"Doctor Doctor" (Schenker, Mogg) - 4:51
"I'm a Loser" (Schenker, Mogg) - 4:12
"Lights Out" (Schenker, Mogg, Parker, Way) - 5:25
"Rock Bottom" (Schenker, Mogg) - 11:25
"Too Hot to Handle" (Way, Mogg) - 5:41
"Shoot Shoot" (Schenker, Mogg, Way, Parker) - 4:07

Disc 7 (Live at the Agora Ballroom, Columbus, Ohio, USA, 17 October 1978)
"Hot 'n' Ready" (Schenker, Mogg) - 3:50
"Pack It Up (And Go)" (Way, Schenker, Mogg) - 3:36
"Cherry" (Way, Mogg) - 3:59
"Let It Roll" (Schenker, Mogg) - 5:07
"Love to Love" (Schenker, Mogg) - 8:42
"Natural Thing" (Schenker, Mogg, Way) - 3:56
"Out in the Street" (Way, Mogg) - 5:44
"Too Hot to Handle" (Way, Mogg) - 5:38
"I'm a Loser" (Schenker, Mogg) - 4:44
"On with the Action" (Schenker, Mogg) - 5:04
"Doctor Doctor" (Schenker, Mogg) - 5:30
"Lights Out" (Schenker, Mogg, Parker, Way) - 5:48
"Rock Bottom" (Schenker, Mogg) - 13:58
"Shoot Shoot" (Schenker, Mogg, Way, Parker) - 4:11

Disc 8 (Live at the Louisville Gardens, Louisville, Kentucky, USA, 18 October 1978)
"Hot 'n' Ready" (Schenker, Mogg) - 3:46
"Pack It Up (And Go)" (Way, Schenker, Mogg) - 3:29
"Cherry" (Way, Mogg) - 4:07
"Let It Roll" (Schenker, Mogg) - 4:46
"Love to Love" (Schenker, Mogg) - 8:08
"Natural Thing" (Schenker, Mogg, Way) - 3:39
"Out in the Street" (Way, Mogg) - 5:32
"Only You Can Rock Me" (Way, Schenker, Mogg) - 4:32
"On with the Action" (Schenker, Mogg) - 5:19
"Doctor Doctor" (Schenker, Mogg) - 5:05
"I'm a Loser" (Schenker, Mogg) - 4:26
"Lights Out" (Schenker, Mogg, Parker, Way) - 5:50
"Rock Bottom" (Schenker, Mogg) - 11:18
"Too Hot to Handle" (Way, Mogg) - 4:32
"Shoot Shoot" (Schenker, Mogg, Way, Parker) - 4:09
Note: the first 5 tracks of each of these consecutive shows was consistent, after which the band played somewhere between seven and ten more additional songs.  A mapping of each of the show differences:

Personnel
UFO
Phil Mogg – vocals
Michael Schenker – lead guitar
Paul Raymond – keyboards, rhythm guitar, backing vocals
Pete Way – bass guitar
Andy Parker – drums

Production
Ron Nevison – producer, engineer
Mike Clink – assistant engineer
Brian Chubb – live sound engineer 
Alan McMillan – horn arrangements, string arrangements
Hipgnosis – artwork

Charts

Certification

References

1979 live albums
UFO (band) live albums
Chrysalis Records live albums
Albums produced by Ron Nevison
Albums with cover art by Hipgnosis